The Insurance Institute for Highway Safety and Highway Loss Data Institute (IIHS-HLDI) is an American nonprofit organization. It was established in 1959, and it is noted for its safety reviews of vehicles in various simulated traffic situations, including the effectiveness of a vehicle's structural integrity and safety systems during a collision, in addition to examining improvement on such elements.

History 
The IIHS was founded in 1959 by three separate insurance groups as a supporting entity to other academic and research organizations involving highway safety. Russell Brown served as the inaugural president of the IIHS until 1968, when its board of governors changed the IIHS to an independent scientific organization. The following year, Physician William Haddon Jr. assumed the position of IIHS president after the change, and the IIHS began conducting crash tests starting with the low-speed bumper test.

In 1972, the Highway Loss Data Institute (HLDI) was founded as a supporting organization to the IIHS, as was the latter's original purpose for other organizations. The HLDI compiles and publishes insurance loss statistics due to incidents such as traffic collisions and consequential damages depending on the vehicle type.

The IIHS and HLDI are interchangeably referred to as one entity (IIHS-HLDI) or separate entities by the organization itself.

Frontal crash tests

 

The IIHS evaluates six individual categories, assigning each a "Good", "Acceptable", "Marginal", or "Poor" rating before determining the vehicle's overall frontal impact rating.

Moderate overlap frontal test
The moderate overlap test (formerly frontal offset test), introduced in January 1995, differs from that of the U.S. government's National Highway Traffic Safety Administration (NHTSA) New Car Assessment Program (NCAP) in that its tests are offset.

As with the NHTSA's frontal impact test, vehicles across different weight categories may not be directly compared. This is because the heavier vehicle is generally considered to have an advantage if it encounters a lighter vehicle or is involved in a single-vehicle crash. The IIHS demonstrated this by crashing three midsize sedans with three smaller "Good" rated minicars. The three minicars were rated "Poor" in these special offset head-on car-to-car tests in 2009, while the midsize cars rated "Good" or "Acceptable".

In December 2022 the IIHS updated the moderate overlap test to include a second crash test dummy seated behind the driver. The IIHS said that the advanced seat belt protections found in the front passenger seats, including crash tensioners and load limiters, should also exist in the rear passenger seats. Out of 15 small SUVs subjected to the new test, nine received an overall rating of poor due to high rear passenger injury measurements to the head, neck and chest.

Small overlap frontal test
On August 14, 2012, IIHS released the first results for a new test, called the "small overlap front test." The new test, which is used in addition to the 40% offset test introduced in 1995, subjects only 25% of the front end of the vehicle to a 40 mph impact against a solid, rounded-off barrier. As a result, it is far more demanding on the vehicle structure than the 40% offset test. In the first round of tests, composed of 11 midsized luxury and near-luxury vehicles, most vehicles did poorly; only three vehicles received "good" or "acceptable" ratings.

The rating system is similar to the 40% offset, but has some key differences: hip/thigh and lower leg/foot ratings replace individual ratings for each leg and foot, and a full score cannot be attained without deployment of front and side curtain airbags (due to the severe side movement often resulting from this test).

A Medical College of Wisconsin study found small-overlap collisions result in increased head, chest, spine, hip, and pelvis injuries. This sort of collision is common on two-lane roads with two-way traffic where a center median is absent. Single vehicle crashes (into a tree or a pole) account for 40% of small-overlap crashes. According to the IIHS, 25% of frontal crash deaths are due to small overlap crashes, with the outer front wheel first to receive the impact forces rather than the more central crash absorbing structure.

The IIHS has since tested family cars, compact cars, minicars, small and midsized SUVs, minivans, muscle cars and large pickup trucks through the small-overlap test.

In 2017, the IIHS began conducting this test on the passenger side of vehicles.

Side impact test 

The IIHS introduced the side impact test in 2003. This test is used to simulate the impact of a high-riding pickup or SUV on the subject vehicle.

The IIHS cited the original test being unrealistic as the main reason for the modification. This modified side test officially began in 2021. Out of 20 small SUVs tested in the new, tougher side impact tests, only one received a Good rating. In May 2022, the IIHS officially completed its test for the tougher, side crash test on 18 midsize SUVs. Ten midsize SUVs earned good ratings, two more with Acceptable ratings, and six with marginal overall ratings.

Roof strength test 

In the United States rollovers accounted for nearly 25% of passenger vehicle fatalities.  Features such as electronic stability control are proven to significantly reduce rollovers and lane departure warning systems may also help.  Rollover sensing side curtain airbags also help to minimize injuries in the event of a rollover.

In the test, which was introduced in 2009, the vehicle rests on a platform while a hydraulic metal plate diagonally pushes on the roof area above the side windows. In order to get the highest rating, the vehicle must withstand a force equivalent to at least four times its curb weight before collapsing .

50th Anniversary crash test

In 2009, the IIHS celebrated its 50th anniversary. To illustrate how much automotive safety has progressed in five decades, IIHS tested a 1959 Chevrolet Bel Air crashing head-on, 40% offset with a 2009 Chevrolet Malibu at 40 mph. It put the video of the crash on the Internet and "the results were no surprise to anyone with a passing familiarity with cars." The Bel Air's occupant compartment was extensively damaged by the crash. Coupled with the car's lack of modern safety features such as airbags and seat belts, this resulted in the crash test dummy in the Bel Air recording forces that would have probably caused fatal injuries to a real driver. They "would not only hit the inside of the car and experience a large (and damaging acceleration) but the car would smash you on the inside." Sophisticated engineering and high-strength steel give modern vehicles a huge advantage.

Head restraint evaluation
This tests the vehicle's driver seat to determine effectiveness of the head restraints. The driver's seat is placed on a sled to mimic rear-end collisions at 20 mph. Rear-end collisions at low to moderate speeds typically do not result in serious injuries but they are common. In 2005 the IIHS estimated 25% of medical costs were related to whiplash injuries.

Frontal collision avoidance evaluation

Vehicle-to-vehicle 
In this test, an engineer drives the test car toward a rolling, cushioned box, which is used to simulate an actual car. The ratings, "basic", "advanced", and "superior", are awarded depending on whether the front crash prevention system meets government criteria, and if the system can reduce the speed or avoid the collision at both 12 and 25 mph (19 and 40. km/h).

Vehicle-to-pedestrian 
The IIHS runs this test in three different scenarios, each scenario having two different speeds for the tested vehicle.

Headlight evaluation
In March 2016, the IIHS released ratings for headlight performance. Their first test involved family cars, and most earned marginal or poor ratings. Only one vehicle, the Toyota Prius V, earned a good rating when equipped with specific headlights. The Institute evaluated headlights for small SUVs 4 months later, and none of the vehicles tested earn a good rating. In October 2016, they released ratings for pickup trucks, and the Honda Ridgeline was the only pickup to earn a good rating on the headlights test when equipped with specific headlights.

Awards
The Top Safety Pick (TSP) is an annual award to the best-performing cars of the year. As of the latest revisions to the award requirements in February 2023, a vehicle must receive overall marks of "Good" in the moderate overlap front, driver-side small overlap front and passenger-side small overlap front tests, as well as the side test that was updated in 2021. Additionally, the headlight rating criteria across all trims of a vehicle must either be "Good" or "Acceptable." Ratings for roof strength, head restraints and vehicle-to-vehicle front crash prevention were previously part of the overall TSP evaluation, but were removed in 2023 as nearly all vehicles tested performed well in these categories. The Top Safety Pick+ award (TSP+) is given to vehicles that meet all the criteria for a Top Safety Pick and perform well in the nighttime vehicle-to-pedestrian front crash test, where some crash prevention systems may struggle due to low light conditions.

In the media
After a small segment on MotorWeek '91 in which former president Brian O'Neill demonstrated the institute's bumper crash testing system, the IIHS began to receive national media coverage. When the IIHS began its moderate overlap frontal test program in 1995, Dateline NBC correspondent Lea Thompson was invited to watch its crash tests, and segments about the institute's crash test programs became a regular feature on Dateline throughout the mid-1990s and 2000s. Other IIHS tests were later covered, including bumper crash tests, side-impact crash tests, and head restraint evaluation tests. Some of these segments are credited for pushing automakers into designing safer cars, such as when the IIHS tested the 1997-2005 GM U platform minivans. They were named the worst performing vehicles it had ever tested, with potentially fatal injuries for the driver. Their successors, offered from 2005 to 2009, were markedly improved, and received a "Good" rating from the institute. The 1997-2003 Ford F-150 was later named the 2nd worst performing vehicle, also with potentially fatal injuries for the driver. The redesigned 2004 Ford F-150 received a "Good" rating from the institute. When Brian O'Neill stepped down as IIHS president in 2006, the IIHS segments were much shorter, and less frequent, until they ended around late-2006, when correspondent Lea Thompson left Dateline NBC. Many of these Dateline segments are available to watch on YouTube.

See also
 BeSeatSmart Child Passenger Safety Program
 Head injury criterion
 National Highway Traffic Safety Administration

References

External links

 

Automotive safety
New Car Assessment Programs
Non-profit organizations based in Arlington, Virginia
Road safety organizations